Bupyeong High School (BHS) is a public secondary school (grades 10-12 high school) for boys in South Korea, which is located in Bupyeong-dong, Bupyeong-gu, Incheon, South Korea. The BHS was opened on March 6, 1972. The School Mascot is a “Green Lion”.

Established in 1971 to educate selected boys from Gyeonggi Province including Incheon, the BHS later became one of the public schools for boys in Incheon was granted Directly Governed City status in 1981(Incheon was officially separated from Gyeonggi Province) is now home to a diverse student body from all backgrounds in Incheon. Among Bupyeong High School students, over 90% enroll in a four-year college.

History 
 1971 Established
 1972 Opened
 1975 Held the 1st commencement
 1978 Founded ssireum club
 1982 Founded football club
 1989 Held the 15th commencement
 1994 Held the 20th commencement
 2018 Held the 44th commencement (Total Alumni: 21,050 Persons)

Curriculum
Bupyeong High School offers Music, Fine Arts, Literature, General Science, General Math, Precalculus,  Korean Language, Korean History, World History, Ethics, Home Economics, World Languages including English and Japanese, Classical Chinese (Hanmun), and a variety of Electives to students. Upperclassmen are allowed to take Advanced English Language, Calculus, and Physics as early as their 11th grade year. Among BHS students, over 90% enroll in a four-year college.

Cultural festival: Budeokje 
The BHS has Bugeokje() is the cultural festival held in November or December annually. Most students have been took part in chorus, dance, play, photography, sports, science experiments, and among other club programs show off their talents in the festival. Also, some clubs like chorus or K-pop dance from neighboring girl's high schools used to take part in the festival.

Athletics 
The BHS is famous for its excellent sports teams, especially football club and ssireum club. In 2018, the Bupyeong High School Football Club (BHSFC) became the champion of the National High School Football League sponsored by the president of Republic of Korea. It was the 6th champion title. 

In 2019, the Bupyeong High School Ssireum Club (BHSSC) became the high school champion team of the Haksan National Ssireum League.

Notable alumni

Politics
Lee Hak-jae, South Korean Politician 
Cha Jun-taek, South Korean Politician 
Choi Won-sik, South Korean Politician 
Maeng Sung-kyu, South Korean Politician 
Yoo Young-rok, South Korean Politician 
Do Sung-hoon, South Korean Politician 
Hong Cheol-ho, South Korean Politician

Media
Noh Jong-myeon,  Journalist, YTN News Presenter
Kim Yeon-kwang, Journalist

Business
Nam Bong-hyun, CEO of Incheon Port Authority (IPA)
Kang Shin-woo, CIO of Korea Investment Corporation (KIC)

Sports
Kim Bong-gil, South Korean Footballer
Lee Chun-soo, South Korean Footballer
Choi Tae-uk, South Korean Footballer
Kim Nam-il, South Korean Footballer
Noh Jung-yoon, South Korean Footballer
Gwak Kyung-keun, South Korean Footballer
Lee Lim-saeng, South Korean Footballer
Ha Sung-min, South Korean Footballer
Kim Jung-woo, South Korean Footballer
Kim Min-tae, South Korean Footballer
Kim Seung-yong, South Korean Footballer
Kim Young-chul, South Korean Footballer
Kim Tae-ho, South Korean Footballer
Kim Hyung-il, South Korean Footballer
Do Hwa-sung, South Korean Footballer
Park Byung-gyu, South Korean Footballer
Park Sung-ho, South Korean Footballer
Park Yong-ho, South Korean Footballer
Park Won-hong, South Korean Footballer
Baek Jong-hwan, South Korean Footballer
An Sung-min, South Korean Footballer
Ahn Hyeon-beom, South Korean Footballer
An Hyo-yeon, South Korean Footballer
Lee Keun-ho, South Korean Footballer
Jeong Yeong-chong, South Korean Footballer
Cho Yong-hyung, South Korean Footballer
Ha Dae-sung, South Korean Footballer
Ha Sung-min, South Korean Footballer
Han Jae-woong, South Korean Footballer
Ko Gyeong-cheol, South Korean Ssireum Wrestler
Kasugaō Katsumasa, South Korean Sumo Wrestler

Entertainment
 Kwon Hyuk-soo, South Korean Actor
Jeong Yoon-ho, South Korean Comedian

References

External links 
 
 
 BHS Alumni Website

High schools in Seoul
Educational institutions established in 1971
Boys' schools in South Korea